Thomas Albert Pearce (11 May 1847 – 20 August 1898) was an English first-class cricketer.

Pearce was born at Essendon and made his debut in first-class cricket for the South against the Marylebone Cricket Club (MCC) at Lord's in 1872. He next appeared in first-class cricket in 1874, when he played for the MCC against Nottinghamshire at Trent Bridge. He made two first-class appearances in 1875, playing for the South in the North v South fixture and for the Players of the South against the Gentlemen of the South. He made a final first-class appearance in 1876, appearing for the MCC against Nottinghamshire. Across his five first-class appearances, Pearce scored 35 runs, with a high score of 21. He died at St Albans in August 1898.

References

External links

1847 births
1898 deaths
People from Essendon, Hertfordshire
English cricketers
Marylebone Cricket Club cricketers
North v South cricketers
Players of the South cricketers